Oregon is an album by American world music/jazz group Oregon featuring Ralph Towner, Paul McCandless, Glen Moore, and Collin Walcott recorded in 1983 and released on the ECM label. The album reached number twenty one on Billboards Jazz Albums and Top Jazz Albums charts.

Reception
The Allmusic review by Thom Jurek awarded the album 1½ stars, stating, "If this disc was supposed to signal a new direction in the band's development, somewhere along the line they slipped off track".  

Jazz disc jockey Joe Lex uses "The Rapids" as the outro for his weekly radio show "Dr. Joe's Groove" on WPPM-LP, Philadelphia.

Track listing
All compositions by Oregon except as indicated
 "The Rapids" (Ralph Towner) - 8:29 
 "Beacon" - 2:56 
 "Taos" - 6:15 
 "Beside a Brook" (Paul McCandless) - 4:26 
 "Arianna" (Glen Moore) - 6:29 
 "There Was No Moon That Night" - 7:19 
 "Skyline" - 1:19 
 "Impending Bloom" (Moore) - 7:51
Recorded at Tonstudio Bauer in Ludwigsburg, West Germany in February 1983

Personnel
Paul McCandless - soprano saxophone, oboe, tin flute, English horn, musette
Glen Moore - bass, violin, piano
Ralph Towner - classical guitar, 12 string guitar, piano, synthesizer
Collin Walcott - sitar, percussion, bass drum, voice

Charts

References

ECM Records albums
Oregon (band) albums
1983 albums
Albums produced by Manfred Eicher